Babergh District (pronounced) is a local government district in Suffolk, England.  Primarily a rural area, Babergh contains two towns of notable size: Sudbury, and Hadleigh, which was the administrative centre until 2017. Its council headquarters, which are shared with neighbouring Mid Suffolk, are now based in Ipswich.

The district was formed on 1 April 1974 by the merger of the borough of Sudbury, Hadleigh Urban District, Cosford Rural District, Melford Rural District and Samford Rural District. The district did not have one party of councillors (nor a formal coalition of parties) exercising overall control until 2015.

It is named after the Babergh Hundred, referred to in the Domesday Book of 1086, although it also covers the hundreds of Cosford and Samford.  The southern boundary of the district is marked almost exclusively by the River Stour, which also forms the border with Essex, and it is separated from East Suffolk by the River Orwell. It also neighbours the district of Mid Suffolk.

'Constable Country' is cognate with a large tract of Babergh: drawing visitors to the conservation area Dedham Vale and the well-preserved villages of Long Melford, Lavenham and Kersey for painting, agricultural and architectural history, produce such as fruit, vegetables, cider, cheese and meat, shops, accommodation, restaurants and tea rooms.

In 2011, Babergh and Mid Suffolk District Councils began working together, with one, fully integrated staff structure.

Politics

Elections to the district are held every four years. Until 2019, 43 councillors were elected from 26 wards, since that date the council consists of only 32 councillors from 24 wards. From the first election in 1973 until 2015 no party won an overall majority on the council, but after the 2015 election, the Conservative party gained a large majority. After this election the council was composed of the following councillors:

In 2017 a by-election resulted in the loss of one Conservative and gain of one Labour councillor.

In May 2017 Babergh adopted the Leader/Cabinet governance model and, since January 2018, the leader is Cllr John Ward.

For the 2 May 2019 election, following a boundary review, the number of councillors was reduced to 32 elected from 24 wards and at the election the district reverted to No Overall Control, with the following councillors elected:

Suffolk County Council Electoral Divisions in Babergh

References

External links

Babergh District Council website

 
Non-metropolitan districts of Suffolk